Johannes Eggestein (born 8 May 1998) is a German professional footballer who plays as striker for 2. Bundesliga club FC St. Pauli. He has represented Germany internationally at youth levels U15 through U21.

Career

Youth career
Eggestein started his youth career at TSV Schloß Ricklingen and played there until 2013 when he moved to TSV Havelse.

Since 2013, Eggestein has played for Werder Bremen. In all three years he played for Bremen's youth team he finished as top scorer among the players.

Werder Bremen
On 2 June 2016, Eggestein signed his first professional contract, which lasts until 2019.

On 22 August 2016, he made his professional and first-team debut in Werder Bremen's first-round DFB-Pokal defeat to Sportfreunde Lotte being substituted on in place of Lennart Thy in the 62nd minute. Four days later, he scored his first professional goal in the reserves' 4–2 win against VfL Osnabrück in the 3. Liga.

On 18 August 2018, Eggestein scored his first goal for the first team, in a 6–1 win against Wormatia Worms in the first round of the DFB-Pokal. On 8 April 2019, Werder Bremen announced the extension of his contract.

On 5 October 2020, the last day of the 2020 summer transfer window, Eggestein moved to Austrian Bundesliga club LASK on loan for the 2020–21 season.

Antwerp
Eggestein moved to Belgian First Division A club Antwerp on 5 August 2021.

FC St. Pauli
On 21 June 2022, Eggestein returned to Germany and signed for 2. Bundesliga club FC St. Pauli.

Personal life
Eggestein is the son of former footballer Karl Eggestein who played for TSV Havelse among other clubs in the 2. Bundesliga. His brother Maximilian Eggestein plays for SC Freiburg.

Career statistics

Club

References

External links

Living people
1998 births
Footballers from Hanover
German footballers
Association football forwards
Germany youth international footballers
Germany under-21 international footballers
SV Werder Bremen II players
SV Werder Bremen players
LASK players
Royal Antwerp F.C. players
FC St. Pauli players
Bundesliga players
2. Bundesliga players
3. Liga players
Belgian Pro League players
German expatriate footballers
German expatriate sportspeople in Austria
Expatriate footballers in Austria
German expatriate sportspeople in Belgium
Expatriate footballers in Belgium